Oestocephalus is an extinct genus of aïstopod Stegocephalian that lived during the Carboniferous period. Fossils have been found in the Czech Republic, and in Ohio and Illinois in the United States. It is the type genus of the family Oestocephalidae, although it used to be assigned to the family  Ophiderpetontidae, which is now considered paraphyletic. It was named by Edward Drinker Cope in 1868 and now contains two species, O. amphiuminus and O. nanum.

See also

References

Aistopods
Carboniferous fish of North America
Carboniferous fish of Europe
Taxa named by Edward Drinker Cope
Fossil taxa described in 1868